The Fleisher Covered Bridge, also known as Fleisher's Covered Bridge, is an historic wooden covered bridge located in Oliver Township, near the community of Newport in Perry County, Pennsylvania. It was built as a single-span bridge in 1887.

History and architectural features
Crossing Big Buffalo Creek, the Fleisher Covered Bridge is a 113-foot-long, single-span, Burr truss bridge, which was constructed in 1887.

Steel I-beams were erected in 1960.

This bridge was listed on the National Register of Historic Places in 1980.

In 1986, repairs were completed on the bridge's fourth bearing point. In 1993, engineers recommended the installation of new steel floor beams and hangers to shift the bridge's arch and truss loads to the steel beams.

Gallery

References 

Covered bridges on the National Register of Historic Places in Pennsylvania
Covered bridges in Perry County, Pennsylvania
Bridges completed in 1887
Wooden bridges in Pennsylvania
Bridges in Perry County, Pennsylvania
Tourist attractions in Perry County, Pennsylvania
National Register of Historic Places in Perry County, Pennsylvania
Road bridges on the National Register of Historic Places in Pennsylvania
Burr Truss bridges in the United States